The 2007–08 Portland State Vikings men's basketball team represented Portland State University during the 2007–08 NCAA Division I men's basketball season. The Vikings, led by head coach Ken Bone, played their home games at the Peter Stott Center and were members of the Big Sky Conference. They finished the season 23–10, 14–2 in Big Sky play to finish as regular season champions by three games. They won the Big Sky tournament to earn an automatic bid – the first in school history – to the NCAA tournament. As No. 16 seed in the Midwest region, the Vikings were defeated in the opening round by eventual National champion Kansas.

Roster

Schedule and results

|-
!colspan=9 style=| Regular season

|-
!colspan=9 style=| Big Sky tournament

|-
!colspan=9 style=| NCAA Tournament Tournament

Awards and honors
Jeremiah Dominguez – Big Sky Player of the Year
Ken Bone – Big Sky Men's Coach of the Year

References

Portland State Vikings men's basketball seasons
Portland State
Portland State
Portland State Vikings men's basketball
Portland State Vikings men's basketball
Port
Port